Nam Tae-hee  (Hangul: 남태희; Hanja: 南泰熙; ; born 3 July 1991 in Busan) is a South Korean footballer currently playing for Al-Duhail and the South Korea national team. Besides South Korea, he has played in England, France, and Qatar.
He is a versatile midfielder and can play as attacking midfielder or central midfielder. He is known for his honed technique, smooth movement, and dribbling.

Club career 
Nam played in the Reading's Youth Academy through KFA Youth Project. In July 2009, his first professional contract signed in France with Valenciennes FC. He played his debut on 8 August 2009 against AS Nancy and is currently the youngest Asian player to play in the Ligue 1 at age 18.

In the winter break of the 2011–12 season, Nam agreed to leave Ligue 1 for Qatar Stars League giant Lekhwiya SC on 26 December 2011.

Lekhwiya
Nam made his debut on 1 January 2012 against Al Kharitiyath. He scored his first league goal from a free kick on 19 January 2012.

He made his AFC Champions League debut on 7 March 2012, scoring the only goal against Saudi Al Ahli, thereby scoring the first ever goal for Lekhwiya in any regional competition.

Al Sadd
On 8 February 2019, Al Sadd SC announced that they acquired Nam from fellow Qatari club Al-Duhail SC. Under their agreement, Nam will join Al Sadd in the 2019–20 season and will play for them for three years.

International career 
Nam has represented South Korea at U-13, U-15 and U-17, U-20 and U-23 levels. He made his debut for the Korean senior team on 9 February 2011 in a friendly against Turkey.

Nam represented South Korea at the 2012 Summer Olympics. He appeared as a substitute as Korea beat Japan in the bronze medal match at Cardiff's Millennium Stadium.

On 22 December 2014, Nam was named in South Korea's squad for the 2015 AFC Asian Cup held in Australia. In the team's second group match, Nam scored the only goal as Korea defeated Kuwait 1–0 to ensure qualification to the knockout stage. On 20 November 2018, it was announced that Nam would miss the 2019 AFC Asian Cup in the UAE after being ruled out for six months because of a knee injury.

Career statistics

Club 
Updated 19 March 2023.

International goals
Scores and results list South Korea's goal tally first.

Honours
Lekhwiya/Al-Duhail
Qatar Stars League: 2011–12, 2013–14, 2014–15, 2016–17, 2017–18
Emir of Qatar Cup: 2016, 2018, 2022
Sheikh Jassim Cup: 2015, 2016
Qatar Cup: 2013, 2015, 2018

Al-Sadd
Qatar Stars League: 2020–21
Emir of Qatar Cup: 2020, 2021
Sheikh Jassim Cup: 2019
Qatar Cup: 2020, 2021

South Korea U23
Summer Olympics bronze medal: 2012

South Korea
AFC Asian Cup runner-up: 2015

Individual
Qatari Footballer of the Year: 2017
AFC Champions League All-Star Squad: 2018, 2019

Background 
Nam is hailed as the 'Korean Messi' by Valenciennes fans and has also been touted as a 'magician' and 'wonderkid'. He was Most Valuable Player three times in his youth career in the National Championships in South Korea. Nam became the youngest Korean footballer to play in a professional league in Europe as a result of this game. He is known for his very energetic playing style.

References

External links

 
Nam Tae-hee – National Team Stats at KFA 

1991 births
Living people
Association football midfielders
South Korean footballers
South Korea under-17 international footballers
South Korea under-23 international footballers
South Korea international footballers
South Korean expatriate footballers
Valenciennes FC players
Lekhwiya SC players
Al-Duhail SC players
Al Sadd SC players
Ligue 1 players
Qatar Stars League players
Expatriate footballers in France
South Korean expatriate sportspeople in France
Expatriate footballers in Qatar
South Korean expatriate sportspeople in Qatar
Sportspeople from Ulsan
Footballers at the 2012 Summer Olympics
2015 AFC Asian Cup players
Olympic footballers of South Korea
Olympic medalists in football
Olympic bronze medalists for South Korea
Medalists at the 2012 Summer Olympics
Uiryeong Nam clan